Aephnidiogenidae is a family of trematodes in the order Plagiorchiida.

Genera
Aephnidiogenes Nicoll, 1915
Austroholorchis Bray & Cribb, 1997
Holorchis Stossich, 1901
Neolepocreadium Thomas, 1960
Pseudaephnidiogenes Yamaguti, 1971
Stegodexamene MacFarlane, 1951
Tetracerasta Watson, 1984

References